206th Regional Support Group is a United States Army Reserve unit which controls two Engineer Battalions (the 458th EN BN and 844th EN BN) and seven rank-heavy, 15 soldier Engineer Facilities Detachments (305th EFD, 443rd EFD, 673rd EFD, 904th EFD, 729th EFD, 763rd EFD, and the 415th EFD) each led by a Lieutenant Colonel.  These are located in New York City, New York, Johnstown, Pennsylvania, Ft. Meade, Maryland, Annville, Pennsylvania, Decatur, Georgia, Ft. Jackson, South Carolina, and Knoxville, Tennessee, respectively.  Of the two Engineer Battalions, one (the 458th EN BN) is headquartered in Johnstown, Pennsylvania, and the other (the 844th EN BN) is headquartered in Knoxville, Tennessee. Originally under the 103rd ESC since its creation in 2006, the 206th RSG switched commands to the 412th TEC on 1 October 2019, and was relocated by the US Army Reserve Command from its original location in Springfield, IL to a new location in McLeansville, North Carolina, set to go into effect in January 2021, shortly after the unit returned from Afghanistan in July 2020. The unit relocated its equipment in September 2020, and officially transported the guidon to its new home for its first Battle Assembly at the Mcleansville Army Reserve Center in March 2021. The first two Battle Assemblies of Calendar Year 2021 were conducted telephonically due to the COVID-19 pandemic, so March 2021 was the first Battle Assembly the 206th RSG HHC held at its new location.

Units
The brigade is made up of the following units: https://www.usar.army.mil/Commands/Functional/412th-TEC/412thTECUnits/
 458th Engineer Battalion
 458th Headquarters and Headquarters Detachment  
 458th Forward Support Company
 340th Engineer Company
 358th Engineer Company
 377th Engineer Company
 665th Utilities Detachment
844th Engineer Battalion
844th Headquarters and Headquarters Detachment
 844th Forward Support Company
 357th Engineer Company
 380th Engineer Company
 390th Engineer Company
 702nd Engineer Company
 305th Engineer Facilities Detachment
 443rd Engineer Facilities Detachment
 673rd Engineer Facilities Detachment
 904th Engineer Facilities Detachment
 729th Engineer Facilities Detachment
 763rd Engineer Facilities Detachment
 415th Engineer Facilities Detachment

References

https://www.usar.army.mil/Commands/Functional/412th-TEC/412thTECUnits/
 *Statement of the Headquarters Company Commander, 206th RSG, from August 2015-October 2017 and from July 2019 through September 2020.

Support groups of the United States Army